Fort Pemberton Site may refer to:

Fort Pemberton Site (Greenwood, Mississippi), listed on the National Register of Historic Places in Leflore County, Mississippi
Fort Pemberton Site (Charleston, South Carolina), listed on the National Register of Historic Places in Charleston County, South Carolina